Scrobipalpa chetitica is a moth in the family Gelechiidae. It was described by Povolný in 1974. It is found in Asia Minor.

References

Scrobipalpa
Moths described in 1974